The Recruiting Service Ribbon is a military award of the United States Armed Forces which is issued by every branch of service with the exception of the United States Army (who instead issues the Recruiter Badge). The Recruiting Service Ribbon recognizes those military service members who have completed a successful tour as a military recruiter in one of the United States Military Recruiting Commands.

United States Marine Corps
The Marine Corps Recruiting Ribbon was authorized by order of the Secretary of the Navy on June 7, 1995 with retroactive presentations to January 1, 1973. The Marine Corps Recruiting Ribbon is awarded to Marine Corps officers and enlisted personnel who complete a standard 36-month tour in a United States Marine Corps Recruiting Command.

Eligible Billets:

(a) Marines possessing MOS 4810 or 8412 and have served in MOS 4810 or 8412 billets.
(b) Marines possessing MOS 8411 and assigned to duty in a recruiting billet (MOS 8411).
(c) Marine Corps Recruiting Command Headquarters.
(d) Marine Corps Districts: CO; Operations Office; Assistant for Officer Programs; Prior Service Recruiting Officer; Assistant for Aviation Officer Procurement; Assistant for Enlisted Recruiting; and Sergeant Major.
(e) Recruiting Stations: Commanding Officer; Executive Officer; Operations Officer; Officer Selection Officer; and Sergeant Major.
(f) Command recruiters, (also known as career planners), recruiter aides, and recruiter assistants are not eligible for the MCRR.

United States Navy
The Navy Recruiting Service Ribbon was established by order of the Secretary of the Navy in February 1989.  The first issuance of the award was made on June 1 of that same year with the award retroactive to July 1, 1973.

To be awarded the Navy Recruiting Service Ribbon, a service member must be assigned to one of the United States Navy’s Major Recruiting Commands and must complete a standard three-year tour of duty.  Award of the Navy Recruiting Service Ribbon is open to all branches of the Navy, including reservists on active duty for special work (ADSW) programs.

All those qualifying for the Navy Recruiting Service Ribbon must receive a recommendation from their Commanding officer before the ribbon is presented.  Additional awards of the Navy Recruiting Service Ribbon are denoted by service stars. Bronze numerals, placed near the right edge of the ribbon, are used to denote the number of Gold Wreath awards earned for superior productivity.

The Navy also authorizes a Recruiter Badge which is worn as a temporary award during a service member’s tour of duty as a naval recruiter.

United States Air Force

Since 4 September 2014, service as a recruiter is recognized by the award of the Developmental Special Duty Ribbon, along with Air Force and Space Force training instructors.

Prior to the creation of the Special Duty ribbon, the Air Force Recruiter Ribbon was established by order of the Secretary of the Air Force on June 21, 2000.  It was worth 2 points in the Weighted Airmen Promotion System at one point, and was declared obsolete in 2014. Personnel graduating from the Air Force Recruiting School had worn the Air Force Recruiter Ribbon immediately provided that the service member is serving in a United States Air Force Command. After thirty six months of recruiting duty, the award was awarded permanently providing the service member’s tour as a recruiter has been free of disciplinary action.
Additional awards of the Air Force Recruiter Ribbon were denoted by oak leaf clusters, and was carried on to the Special Duty ribbon, and the award was retroactive to any member of the Air Force who performed thirty six months or more as an Air Force recruiter, provided that the service member was on active duty after June 2000.

The Air Force also issues a Recruiter Badge for temporary wear while serving in duties as an Air Force Recruiter.

United States Coast Guard
The Coast Guard Recruiting Service Ribbon was created by the Commandant of the United States Coast Guard on November 2, 1995.  The award is retroactive to January 1, 1980 and is presented to any member of the Coast Guard who completes a standard two-year tour as a Coast Guard Recruiter.

Additional awards of the Coast Guard Recruiting Service Ribbon are denoted by service stars.  Like the Navy, the Coast Guard also issues a Recruiter Badge as a temporary award worn while a service member is serving as a Coast Guard Recruiter.

References 

 

Awards and decorations of the United States Air Force
Awards and decorations of the United States Coast Guard
Awards and decorations of the United States Marine Corps
Awards and decorations of the United States Navy
Awards established in 1995 
Awards established in 1989 
Awards established in 2000 
Military recruitment
Military ribbons of the United States
US Coast Guard ribbon symbolism